Ralph Young may refer to:

 Ralph Young (American football, born 1946), American football coach
 Ralph Young (baseball) (1888–1965), American baseball player
 Ralph Young (singer) (1918–2008), American singer and actor
 Ralph "Brigham" Young (1898–1967), American politician in the state of Washington
 Ralph F. Young, American historian
 Ralph H. Young (1889–1962), American college sports coach, athletics administrator, state legislator
 Ralph B. Young (born 1945), Canadian real estate developer